The Diocese of Zanzibar may refer to;

Anglican Diocese of Zanzibar, in Zanzibar
Roman Catholic Diocese of Zanzibar, in Zanzibar